Onchidella is a genus of small, air-breathing sea slugs, shell-less marine pulmonate gastropod molluscs in the family Onchidiidae.

Species
According to the World Register of Marine Species (WoRMS), the following species with valid names are included within the genus  Onchidella :

 Onchidella accrensis (Plate, 1893)
 Onchidella armadilla (Mörch, 1863)
 Onchidella binneyi Stearns, 1894
 Onchidella borealis Dall, 1871 - northwest Onchidella
 Onchidella brattstroemi Ev. Marcus, 1978
 Onchidella campbelli Filhol, 1880
 Onchidella carpenteri (W. G. Binney, 1860) (nomen dubium)
 Onchidella celtica (Cuvier, 1817)
 Onchidella flavescens Wissel, 1904
 Onchidella floridana (Dall, 1885) - Florida Onchidella
 Onchidella incisa (Quoy & Gaimard, 1832)
 Onchidella indolens (Couthouy in Gould, 1852)
 Onchidella kurodai (Taki, 1935)
 Onchidella maculata (Plate, 1893)
 Onchidella marginata (Couthouy in Gould, 1852)
 Onchidella miusha Ev. Marcus, 1978
 Onchidella monodi (Gabe, Prenant & Sourie, 1951)
 Onchidella nigricans (Quoy & Gaimard, 1832)
 Onchidella oniscioides (Blainville, 1816)
 Onchidella orientalis (Taki, 1935)
 Onchidella pachyderma (Plate, 1893)
 Onchidella philippei Ev. Marcus, 1979
 Onchidella reticulata (Semper, 1885)
 Onchidella souriei (Gabe & Prenant, 1955)
 Onchidella steindachneri (J. O. Semper, 1882) - Galapagos Islands
 Onchidella wah Ev. Marcus, 1978

Synonymized species 
 Onchidella capensis - South Africa   : synonym of Onchidella maculata (Plate, 1893)
 Onchidella chilensis (Huppé in Gay, 1854) accepted as Checked: verified by a taxonomic editorOnchidella marginata (Couthouy in Gould, 1852)
 Onchidella condoriana Rochebrune, 1882 : synonym of Oncis stuxbergi (Westerlund, 1883)
 Onchidella griseofusca Tapparone-Canefri, 1874 accepted as Onchidium griseofuscum (Tapparone-Canefri, 1874)
 Onchidella griseo-fusca Tapparone Canefri, 1874 accepted as Unreviewed: has not been verified by a taxonomic editorOnchidium griseofuscum (Tapparone Canefri, 1874)
 Onchidella hardwickii Gray, 1850 accepted as Onchidium hardwickii (Gray, 1850)
 Onchidella hildae (Hoffmann, 1928): synonym of Onchidella binneyi Stearns, 1894
 Onchidella irrorata (Gould, 1852) accepted as Onchidella nigricans (Quoy & Gaimard, 1832)
 Onchidella juanfernandeziana (Wissel, 1898) accepted as Onchidella marginata (Couthouy in Gould, 1852)
 Onchidella nigra Gray, 1850 accepted as Scaphis atra (Lesson, 1830)
 Onchidella obscura (Plate, 1893) accepted as Onchidella nigricans (Quoy & Gaimard, 1832)
 Onchidella patelloida (Quoy & Gaimard, 1832) accepted as Onchidella nigricans (Quoy & Gaimard, 1832)
 Onchidella patelloides (Quoy & Gaimard, 1832) : synonym of Onchidella nigricans (Quoy & Gaimard, 1832)
 Onchidella pulchella Watson, 1925 accepted as Onchidella maculata (Plate, 1893)
 Onchidella reevesii Reeve in J.E. Gray, 1850 accepted as Paraoncidium reevesii (Reeve in J.E. Gray, 1850)
 Onchidella remanei Er. Marcus & Ev. Marcus, 1956 accepted as Onchidella celtica (Cuvier, 1817)

References

 
 G M Branch, C L Griffiths, M L Branch, & L E Beckley, Two Oceans, A Guide to the Marine Life of Southern Africa, David Philip Publishers (Pty) Ltd, Claremont, South Africa 1994 
 Powell A. W. B., New Zealand Mollusca, William Collins Publishers Ltd, Auckland, New Zealand 1979 
 Onchidella celtica
 Dayrat, B. (2009) Review of the current knowledge of the systematics of Onchidiidae (Mollusca: Gastropoda: Pulmonata) with a checklist of nominal species. Zootaxa 2068: 1–26

Onchidiidae
Gastropod genera
Taxa named by John Edward Gray